Chin's Kitchen is a Chinese restaurant in Portland, Oregon, United States.

Description 
The Chinese restaurant Chin's Kitchen is located in northeast Portland's Hollywood neighborhood. A neon sign is displayed on the exterior.

History 
Chin's Kitchen opened in 1949.

Sisters Chang Feng "Wendy" and Change "Cindy" Li purchased the restaurant in 2017. In November, the restaurant closed temporarily for a kitchen renovation and other upgrades.

Chin's closed briefly during the COVID-19 pandemic.

Reception 
In Eater Portland's 2021 overview of "Where to Find Outstanding Chinese Takeout in Portland and Beyond", Seiji Nanbu and Brooke Jackson-Glidden recommended the la pi (vegetable salt with noodles), dumplings, and the  Chinese sauerkraut and pork. The website's Nathan Williams included the restaurant in a 2022 list of "14 Standout Spots in Portland’s Eclectic Hollywood District".

See also 

 List of Chinese restaurants

References

External links 

 
 Chin's Kitchen at the Food Network
 Chin's Kitchen at Lonely Planet
 Chin's Kitchen at Willamette Week (2018)
 Chin's Kitchen at Zomato

1949 establishments in Oregon
Chinese restaurants in Portland, Oregon
Hollywood, Portland, Oregon
Restaurants established in 1949